Sacsayhuamán, often spelled Saqsaywaman or Xacxaguaman,  (possibly from Quechua language, waman falcon or variable hawk), is a citadel on the northern outskirts of the city of Cusco, Peru, the historic capital of the Inca Empire.

The complex was built by the Incas in the 15th century, particularly under Emperor Pachacuti and his successors. Dry stone walls constructed of huge stones were built on the site, with the workers carefully cutting the boulders to fit them together tightly without mortar.

In 1983, Cusco and Sacsayhuamán together were designated as sites on the UNESCO World Heritage List, for international recognition and protection. The site is now constantly explored by tourists.

Description
Located on a steep hill that overlooks the city, the fortified complex has a wide view of the valley to the southeast. Archeological studies of surface collections of pottery at Sacsayhuamán indicate that the earliest occupation of the hilltop dates to about 900 CE.

According to Inca oral history, Tupac Inca 
"remembered that his father Pachacuti had called city of Cuzco the lion city.  He said that the tail was where the two rivers unite which flow through it, that the body was the great square and the houses round it, and that the head was wanting."The Inca decided the "best head would be to make a fortress on a high plateau to the north of the city."

During the 15th century, the Imperial Inca expanded on this settlement, building dry stone walls constructed of huge stones. Spanish Chronicler Pedro Cieza De Leon wrote in 1553: "The Fortress had been begun in the days of Pachacuti; his son Topa Inca and Huayna Capac and Huascar [d. 1532] added greatly to it." Cieza writes of the construction that Pachacuti "ordered 20,000 men sent in from the proviences" and that "4000 of them quarried and cut the stones; 6000 hauled them with great cables of leather and hemp; the others dug the dig and laid the foundations, while still others cut poles and beams for the timbers."

After ambushing Atahualpa during the Spanish Conquest of Peru, Francisco Pizarro sent Martin Bueno and two other Spaniards to help transport gold and silver from the Temple of Coricancha in Cusco to Cajamarca, where the Spaniards were based.  They found the Temple of the Sun "covered with plates of gold", which the Spanish supposedly ordered removed as payment for Atahualpa's ransom.  Seven hundred plates were removed, and added to two hundred cargas of gold transported back to Cajamarca.

After Francisco Pizarro finally entered Cuzco, Pedro Pizarro described what they found, 
"on top of a hill they [the Inca] had a very strong fort surrounded with masonry walls of stones and having two very high round towers.  And in the lower part of this wall there were stones so large and thick that it seemed impossible that human hands could have set them in place...they were so close together, and so well fitted, that the point of a pin could not have been inserted in one of the joints.  The whole fortress was built up in terraces and flat spaces."  The numerous rooms were "filled with arms, lances, arrows, darts, clubs, bucklers and large oblong shields...there were many morions...there were also...certain stretchers in which the Lords travelled, as in litters." Pedro Pizarro described in detail storage rooms that were within the complex and filled with military equipment.

The large plaza, capable of holding thousands of people, was designed for communal ceremonial activities. Several of the large structures at the site may also have been used during rituals. A similar relationship to that between Cuzco and Sacsayhuamán was replicated by the Inca in their distant colony where Santiago, Chile developed. The Inca fortress there, known as Chena, predated the Spanish colonial city. It was a ceremonial ritual site known as Huaca de Chena.

The best-known zone of Sacsayhuamán includes its great plaza and its adjacent three massive terrace walls. The stones used in the construction of these terraces are among the largest used in any building in pre-Hispanic America. They display a precision of cutting and fitting that is unmatched in the Americas. The stones are so closely spaced that a single piece of paper will not fit between many of the stones. This precision, combined with the rounded corners of the blocks, the variety of their interlocking shapes, and the way the walls lean inward, is thought to have helped the ruins survive devastating earthquakes in Cuzco.  The longest of the three walls is about 400 meters. They are about 6 meters tall. The estimated volume of stone is over 6,000 cubic meters. Estimates for the weight of the largest andesite block vary from 128 tonnes to almost 200 tonnes.

Following the siege of Cusco, the Spaniards began to use Sacsayhuamán as a source of stones for building Spanish Cuzco; within a few years, they had taken apart and demolished much of the complex. The site was destroyed block by block to salvage materials with which to build the new Spanish governmental and religious buildings of the colonial city, as well as the houses of the wealthiest Spaniards. In the words of Garcilaso de la Vega (1966:471 [1609: Part 1, Book. Bk. 7, Ch. 29]): 
"to save themselves the expense, effort and delay with which the Indians worked the stone, they pulled down all the smooth masonry in the walls. There is indeed not a house in the city that has not been made of this stone, or at least the houses built by the Spaniards."Today, only the stones that were too large to be easily moved remain at the site.

On 13 March 2008, archaeologists discovered additional ruins at the periphery of Sacsayhuamán. It has been theorized that the site was first built upon during the Killke period, which preceded the Inca. While appearing ceremonial in nature, the exact function remains unknown.

In January 2010, parts of the site were damaged during periods of heavy rainfall in the region.

Modern-day use
Peruvians continue to celebrate Inti Raymi, the annual Inca festival of the winter solstice and new year. It is held near Sacsayhuamán on 24 June. Another important festival is Warachikuy, held there annually on the third Sunday of September.

Some people from Cusco use the large field within the walls of the complex for jogging, t'ai chi, and other athletic activities.

See also
List of buildings and structures in Cusco
List of megalithic sites
 Huaca de Chena

References

External links

BBC Article New Discoveries at Sacsayhuamán
World's Greatest Riddles Mystery of Sacsayhuamán

Lost ancient cities and towns
Buildings and structures in Cusco
Ruins in Peru
Inca
Esoteric anthropogenesis
Archaeological sites in Peru
Archaeological sites in Cusco Region
Tourist attractions in Cusco Region
Forts in Peru
Polygonal masonry